Countess Amalie Henriette Charlotte of Solms-Baruth (Kliczków, 30 January 1768 – Karlsruhe, 31 October 1847) was an Imperial countess of Solms by birth and Princess of Hohenlohe-Langenburg by marriage.

Early life 
She was the only child of Count Johann Christian II, Count of Solms-Baruth and his wife, Countess Friederike Louise of Reuss-Köstritz.

Marriage and issue
She married on 30 January 1789 with Charles Louis, Prince of Hohenlohe-Langenburg. They had the following children: 
 Princess Louise of Hohenlohe-Langenburg
 Princess Elisabeth of Hohenlohe-Langenburg (1790–1830); married Victor Amadeus, Landgrave of Hesse-Rotenburg, Duke of Ratibór
 Princess Constance of Hohenlohe-Langenburg (1792–1847); married Franz Joseph, 5th Prince of Hohenlohe-Schillingsfürst
 Princess Emilie of Hohenlohe-Langenburg (1793–1859); married Count Friedrich Ludwig of Castell-Castell; their daughter Countess Adelheid married Julius, Count of Lippe-Biesterfeld and had issue
 Prince Ernst of Hohenlohe-Langenburg (1794–1860); married in 1828 Princess Feodora of Leiningen (1807–1872)
 Prince Frederick of Hohenlohe-Langenburg
 Princess Marie Henriette of Hohenlohe-Langenburg
 Princess Louise of Hohenlohe-Langenburg; married Prince Adolf zu Hohenlohe-Ingelfingen
 Princess Johanna of Hohenlohe-Langenburg; married Count Emil Christian of Erbach-Schönberg
 Princess Mary Agnes of Hohenlohe-Langenburg; married Konstantin, Hereditary Prince of Löwenstein-Wertheim-Rosenberg
 Prince Henry Gustav of Hohenlohe-Langenburg
 Princess Helene of Hohenlohe-Langenburg (1807–1880); married Duke Eugen of Württemberg
Prince Henry of Hohenlohe-Langenburg

Due to the marriages of her children and grandchildren, she is ancestress to several European monarchs: 
 Prince Hans Adam II of Liechtenstein is the great-grandson of Infanta Maria Theresa of Portugal, whose mother Adelaide was Amalie Henriette's granddaughter.
 King Philippe of Belgium is also a descendant of Adelaide through her daughter Maria Josepha.
 Grand Duke Henri of Luxembourg is also a descendant of Adelaide through her daughters Marie Anne, Maria Antonia and Marie Josepha.
 King Charles XVI Gustav of Sweden is a son of Sibylla, who was the great-great-granddaughter of Amalie Henriette's son Ernest Christiaan.
 Queen Beatrix of the Netherlands is a daughter of Bernhard, who was a great-grandson of Amalie Henriette's daughter Emilie.
 Queen Sophia of Spain and Constantine II of Greece are children of Frederica of Hanover, whose grandmother Empress Augusta Victoria was a granddaughter of Amalie Henriette's son Ernest Christian.

Ancestry

House of Solms-Baruth
German countesses
Princesses of Hohenlohe-Langenburg
1768 births
1847 deaths
18th-century German people
19th-century German people